Sanniquellie Mah District is one of six districts located in Nimba County, Liberia.

References

Districts of Liberia
Nimba County